Neck pain, also known as cervicalgia, is a common problem, with two-thirds of the population having neck pain at some point in their lives.

Neck pain, although felt in the neck, can be caused by numerous other spinal problems. Neck pain may arise due to muscular tightness in both the neck and upper back, or pinching of the nerves emanating from the cervical vertebrae. Joint disruption in the neck creates pain, as does joint disruption in the upper back.

The head is supported by the lower neck and upper back, and it is these areas that commonly cause neck pain. The top three joints in the neck allow for most movement of the neck and head. The lower joints in the neck and those of the upper back create a supportive structure for the head to sit on. If this support system is affected adversely, then the muscles in the area will tighten, leading to neck pain.

Neck pain affects about 5% of the global population as of 2010.

Differential diagnosis
Neck pain may come from any of the structures in the neck including: vascular, nerve, airway, digestive, and musculature / skeletal, or be referred from other areas of the body.

Major and severe causes of neck pain (roughly in order of severity) include:

Carotid artery dissection
Referred pain from acute coronary syndrome
Head and neck cancer
Infections, including:
Meningitis of several types including sudden onset of severe neck or back pain particularly in teens and young adults which may be fatal if not treated quickly
Retropharyngeal abscess
Epiglottitis
Spinal disc herniation – protruding or bulging discs, or if severe prolapse.
Spondylosis - degenerative arthritis and osteophytes
Spinal stenosis – a narrowing of the spinal canal

More common and lesser neck pain causes include:

Stress – physical and emotional stresses
Prolonged postures – many people fall asleep on sofas and chairs and wake up with sore necks.
Minor injuries and falls – car accidents, sporting events, and day to day injuries that are really minor.
Referred pain – mostly from upper back problems
Over-use – muscular strain is one of the most common causes
Whiplash
Pinched nerve

Although the causes are numerous, most are easily rectified by either professional help or using self help advice and techniques.

More causes can include: poor sleeping posture, torticollis, head injury, rheumatoid arthritis,
Carotidynia, congenital cervical rib, mononucleosis, rubella, certain cancers, ankylosing spondylitis,
cervical spine fracture, esophageal trauma, subarachnoid hemorrhage, lymphadenitis, thyroid trauma, and tracheal trauma.

Treatment
Treatment of neck pain depends on the cause.  For the vast majority of people, neck pain can be treated conservatively.  Recommendations in which it helps alleviate symptoms include applying heat or cold.   Other common treatments could include medication, body mechanics training, ergonomic reform, and physical therapy. Treatments may also include patient education, but existing evidence shows a lack of effectiveness.

Medication

Analgesics such as acetaminophen or NSAIDs are generally recommended for pain. A 2017 review, however found that paracetamol was not efficacious and that NSAIDs are minimally effective.

Muscle relaxants may also be recommended. However, one study showed that one muscle relaxant called cyclobenzaprine was not effective for treatment of acute cervical strain (as opposed to neck pain from other etiologies or chronic neck pain).

Surgery
Surgery is usually not indicated for mechanical causes of neck pain. If neck pain is the result of instability, cancer, or other disease process surgery may be necessary. Surgery is usually not indicated for "pinched nerves" or herniated discs unless there is spinal cord compression or pain and disability have been protracted for many months and refractory to conservative treatment such as physical therapy.

Alternative medicine
Exercise plus joint manipulation has been found to be beneficial in both acute and chronic mechanical neck disorders. In particular, specific strengthening exercise may improve function and pain. Motor control using cranio-cervical flexion exercises has been shown to be effective for non-specific chronic neck pain.  Both cervical manipulation and cervical mobilization produce similar immediate-, and short-term changes. Multiple cervical manipulation sessions may provide better pain relief and functional improvement than certain medications at immediate to long-term follow-up. Thoracic manipulation may also improve pain and function. Low-level laser therapy has been shown to reduce pain immediately after treatment in acute neck pain and up to 22 weeks after completion of treatment in patients that experience chronic neck pain. Low quality evidence suggests that cognitive-behavioural therapy may be effective at reducing pain in the short-term. Massaging the area may provide immediate and short-lived benefits, but long term effects are unknown. There is a lack of high-quality evidence to support the use of mechanical traction, and side effects include headaches, nausea and injury to tissue. Radiofrequency denervation may provide temporary relief for specific affected areas in the neck. Transcutaneous electrical nerve stimulation (TENS), the noninvasive use of electrical stimulation on the skin, is of unclear benefit in chronic neck pain.

Epidemiology

Neck pain affects about 330 million people globally as of 2010 (4.9% of the population). It is more common in women (5.7%) than men (3.9%). It is less common than low back pain.

Prognosis
About one-half of episodes resolve within one year and around 10% become chronic.

Prevention 
Prevalence of neck pain in the population suggests it is a common condition. For cervicalgia associated with bad posture the treatment is usually corrective in nature (i.e. ensure shoulders are in one line above the hips) and relating to interventions that provide ergonomic improvement. There is also growing research in how neck pain caused by mobile devices (see iHunch) can be prevented using embedded warning systems.

References

External links 

 6 Ways to Ease Neck Pain - Harvard Medical School
 Neck pain - Symptoms and causes - Mayo Clinic

Human head and neck
Pain